Mushagalusa Bakenga Joar Bahati Namugunga  (born 8 August 1992) is a Norwegian professional footballer who plays as a forward for Stabæk.

Career
At a very young age Bakenga was spotted, his rise to the first team is testament to his undoubted ability to score goals. From the age of 13 he had averaged over 50 goals a season, with these performances linking him to Bayern Munich and Manchester City.
Bakenga began his career with SK Nationalkameratene and joined Rosenborg BK in February 2007. He was on trial with Chelsea's academy in the spring. From 2009 he trained with Rosenborg's senior team twice a week. He also played on the Norwegian u-19 national team, despite not being 17 years old yet. His first selection in the senior squad came in August 2009 against Bodø/Glimt, but he did not play. His actual début in the Tippeligaen came on 23 September 2009 against Tromsø. He nearly scored in the goalless draw—a goal from Bakenga would have secured the league title for Rosenborg.

In 2010, Bakenga was plagued by injuries and played only a few matches for Rosenborg. But, after scoring six times in pre-season, Bakenga secured a position in the starting line-up at the start of 2011 Tippeligaen. He scored Rosenborg's only goal in the loss against Brann, before a wonderful strike against Stabæk. Mush scored 12 league goals in 2011. In January 2012, Hannover 96 offered 10 million NOK (± €1.3m) for Bakenga, but Rosenborg rejected the offer. Later in January, Rosenborg received another offer for Bakenga, this time for €2.6m from Club Brugge. Rosenborg accepted, and Bakenga signed a five-and-a-half-year contract on 28 January. He scored in his debut for Club Brugge, in the 5–1 win against Beerschot on 5 February 2012.
It was not only the goal that he will remember from his debut: "I never ran so fast in my life. I did not even have time to explain to the coach what was wrong. Luckily I just made it in time," said Bakenga, having to run to the toilet during his debut match.

Bakenga played in the 2013 Belgian Cup Final, which Cercle lost 2–0 against Genk.

On 8 July 2014, he joined German club Eintracht Braunschweig on a one-year loan deal.

On 18 March 2015, Bakenga cut short his Eintracht Braunschweig loan deal, signing a one-year loan deal with Norwegian champions Molde FK. On 30 March, seven minutes into his first match for Molde FK, he was carried off the pitch with a torn achilles tendon, sidelining him for at least six months.

In July 2016, Bakenga returned to Rosenborg.

International career
Bakenga has represented Norway from under-15 level up to under-21 level. He scored a hat-trick for the under-19 team in the match against Moldova U19 in April 2011. Later the same year he made his debut for the under-21 team later the same year. He was not included in the Norwegian squad for the 2013 UEFA European Under-21 Football Championship, but scored four goals for the "new" under-21 team in the match against Poland U21 on 10 June 2013.

Having never appeared in a competitive match for Norway, Bakenga remains potentially eligible for DR Congo.

Career statistics

Honours
Rosenborg
Tippeligaen and Eliteserien: 2009, 2010, 2016, 2017
Norwegian Cup: 2016
Superfinalen / Mesterfinalen: 2010, 2017
Norwegian U-19 Championship: 2009, 2011

Cercle Brugge
Belgian Cup runners-up: 2012–13

Personal life
His parents hail from the Democratic Republic of the Congo. He's the nephew of doctor Denis Mukwege.

References

External links
 
 
 
 
 
 
 

Articles using sports links with data from Wikidata
1992 births
Living people
Footballers from Trondheim
Norwegian footballers
Association football forwards
Norway international footballers
Norway under-21 international footballers
Norway youth international footballers
Eliteserien players
Belgian Pro League players
Danish Superliga players
2. Bundesliga players
J1 League players
Rosenborg BK players
Club Brugge KV players
Cercle Brugge K.S.V. players
Esbjerg fB players
Eintracht Braunschweig players
Molde FK players
Tromsø IL players
Ranheim Fotball players
Odds BK players
Tokushima Vortis players
Norwegian people of Democratic Republic of the Congo descent
Norwegian expatriate footballers
Norwegian expatriate sportspeople in Belgium
Expatriate footballers in Belgium
Norwegian expatriate sportspeople in Denmark
Expatriate men's footballers in Denmark
Norwegian expatriate sportspeople in Germany
Expatriate footballers in Japan
Norwegian expatriate sportspeople in Japan
Expatriate footballers in Germany